Bhuteshwar Temple  is a Hindu temple, in the series of 48 kos parikrama of Kurukshetra, dedicated to Bhuteshwar, a manifestation of Lord 
Shiva. Situated in Jind, Haryana, the city noted for its countless temples that are devoted to Lord Shiva. The ruler of the district, Raghbir Singh, constructed a temple, which came to be known as the Bhuteshvara temple. This temple is dedicated to Shiva. It has a large water tank all-around it and this is the reason that the Bhuteshvara temple is also recognized as Rani Talab. The word 'ta-lab' is a Hindi word, which means pond.

The tourists almost all round the year visit this well-known temple. There are much more to see in Jind, like the Hari Kailash temples, Jawala Maleshvara tirath, Dhamtan Sahib Gurudwara and the Surya Kund tanks. One very famous temple, which holds much significance regarding the history of the district, is the Jayanti Devi Temple.

The other places of worship are the temples of Hari Kailash, tanks of Surya Kund, Jawala Malesh-vara tirath. A sacred gurdwara is also present in the town, which is built in memory of Guru Teg Bahadur

There is mythology behind the name Rani Talab that the Rani of Maharaja Ranbir Singh took a bath in this pond every night after crossing a "surang" remnants of which are still present. This is present on the Gohana road which is known as the life line of this ancient city. All the important destinations lie on this road like Govt. Hospital, City Jail, S.P residence, Police line, Defence colony, university etc.

References

Hindu temples in Haryana
Jind
Shiva temples in Haryana